Viqueira is a surname. Notable people with the surname include:

Emilio José Viqueira (born 1974), Spanish footballer
Mike Viqueira (born 1960), American broadcast journalist

See also
Siqueira